Lanny Jaya Regency is a regency (kabupaten) located in the Indonesian province of Highland Papua. It covers an area of 6,077.4 km2, and had a population of 148,522 at the 2010 Census and 196,399 at the 2020 Census. The administrative centre is the town of Tiom.

Administrative Districts
In 2010 the Lanny Jaya Regency comprised ten districts (distrik), listed below with their areas and their populations at the 2010 Census. 

Since 2013, the number of districts has been raised to thirty-nine by the splitting of existing districts. These thirty-nine are listed below with their areas and their populations at the 2020 Census. The table also includes the location of the district administrative centres, the number of administrative villages (rural desa and urban kelurahan) in each and its post code.

References

External links
Statistics publications from Statistics Indonesia (BPS)

Regencies of Highland Papua